Akouda is a small town located a few kilometres north of Sousse, Tunisia.

Administratively attached to the Sousse Governorate, it is the chief town of a delegation of the same name which in 2004 had 21,237 inhabitants, with 18,998 for the town itself.

Notable people 
 Ridha Charfeddine - businessman
 Salem Ben Hmida - poet
 kamel bouin - poet

References

External links 
 
https://www.facebook.com/pages/category/Sports-League/Akouda-Bikerz-100515861956790/ 

Populated places in Tunisia
Communes of Tunisia